Zhongzhou is a railway station on the Taiwan Railways Administration Western Trunk line in Rende District, Tainan, Taiwan. Similar to other stations on the line, it is equipped with multiple card-reading machines.

See also
 List of railway stations in Taiwan

References

1901 establishments in Taiwan
Railway stations in Tainan
Railway stations opened in 1901
Railway stations served by Taiwan Railways Administration